Imper may refer to:

 A village in Plăieșii de Jos commune, Romania
 An abbreviation for imperative mood in grammar